The 94th Regiment Illinois Volunteer Infantry, nicknamed the "McLean Regiment," was an infantry regiment that served in the Union Army during the American Civil War.

Service
The 94th Illinois Infantry was organized in McLean County, Illinois and mustered into Federal service on August 20, 1862.

The regiment was mustered out on July 17, 1865, at Galveston, Texas..

Total strength and casualties
The regiment suffered 9 enlisted men who were killed in action or who died of their wounds and 4 officers and 162 enlisted men who died of disease, for a total of 175 fatalities.

Commanders
Colonel William W. Orme - Promoted to brigadier general on April 4, 1863.
Colonel John McNulta - Mustered out with the regiment.

See also
List of Illinois Civil War Units
Illinois in the American Civil War

Notes

References
The Civil War Archive

External links
94th Illinois Volunteer Infantry Regiment Collection - McLean County Museum of History archives
Letters reveal rigors of Civil War soldiering - Pantagraph (Bloomington, Illinois, newspaper)

Units and formations of the Union Army from Illinois
1862 establishments in Illinois
Military units and formations established in 1862
Military units and formations disestablished in 1865